Ray Green (born 1977) is an American football defensive back.

Ray Green may refer to:

Ray Green (wrestler) in Australian Light Heavyweight Championship
Ray Green (basketball), player in Boston Celtics draft history
Ray Green (composer) (1908–1997), American classical composer and music publisher, see List of compositions for viola: F to H
Ray Green (filmmaker), producer on Deadly Intentions
Ray Green, character in the TV series Travelers

See also
Draymond Green
Raymond Green (disambiguation)
Ray Greene (disambiguation)